Richard Morgan may refer to:

 Sir Richard Morgan (Tudor judge) (died 1556), MP for Gloucester, 1545–53; Chief Justice of the Common Pleas, 1553–55
 Richard Morgan (MP), Member of Parliament (MP) for Montgomery Boroughs
 Richard Hillebrand Morgan, Sri Lankan Burgher lawyer
 Richard Williams Morgan (–1889), Welsh clergyman and author
 Richard Morgan (Ceylonese judge), Ceylonese Chief Justice
 Dick Thompson Morgan (1853–1920), U.S. Representative from Oklahoma
 Richard Morgan (actor) (1958–2006), Australian actor
 Richie Morgan (born 1946), Welsh footballer and manager
 Richard K. Morgan (born 1965), British science fiction author
 Richard Morgan (cricketer) (born 1972), New Zealand cricketer 
 Richard E. Morgan (1937–2014), American conservative author of non-fiction
 Richard T. Morgan (1952–2018), American politician from North Carolina
 Richard Morgan, winning driver of  the Formula Ford Festival auto race in 1974

Characters 
 Richard Morgan, character from the 2002 film The Ring
 Richard Morgan, main character in the historical novel, Morgan's Run